Saulnier may refer to:

People
 Cyril Saulnier, French tennis player 
 Jeremy Saulnier, American film director
 Jill Saulnier, Canadian ice hockey player
 Jules Saulnier, French architect
 Lucien Saulnier, Canadian politician
 Raymond Saulnier (aircraft manufacturer), joint founder of the Morane-Saulnier aircraft company
 Raymond J. Saulnier, American economist
 Steve Saulnier, American football player and coach
 Tania Saulnier, Canadian actress

Other uses
 Morane-Saulnier, French aircraft manufacturer
 List of aircraft (S), Saulnier
 Saulnières (disambiguation)
Occupational surnames